The Appoquinimink School District is a public school district in southern New Castle County, Delaware. The district office is located in the Odessa Park Building, 313 South Fifth Street, in Odessa, Delaware, with Matthew Burrows as the current superintendent. Former superintendent Tony Marchio retired in June 2011. The district is growing by nearly 600 students every year, making it the fastest growing school district in Delaware.

In addition to Odessa it serves Middletown, Townsend, and a portion of Glasgow.

History
In 1983 Olive B. Loss, a teacher, was voted in as superintendent by all members of the school board.

Schools 
High schools (9-12)
 Appoquinimink High School (Middletown)
 Middletown High School (Middletown)
 Odessa High School (unincorporated area)

Middle schools (6-8)
Alfred G. Waters Middle School 
Waters was a 9th grade-only school for one year while AHS was being built, then opened as a 6-8 grade school in fall 2008. It has 25 classrooms and a 500 seat auditorium. The building, which had its dedication ceremony in 2007, was named after a principal of the Ninth Grade Academy, a woman
Everett Meredith Middle School 
Meredith opened as the grades 1-12 Middletown School in 1929. Its building previously housed MHS building until it moved to its current location in 1997. EMMS is named after a teacher and houses Appoquinimink Adult Continuing Education programs at night. The original building was completely demolished in 2020 and is being rebuilt from the ground up under the same name, which has finished construction and opened in late August of 2022
Louis L. Redding Middle School
Middletown 120C opened in 1952 as a segregated 1-9 school for Black students. Its namesake is Louis L. Redding.

Elementary schools (1-5)
Brick Mill Elementary
Bunker Hill Elementary 
Opened in 2009. This school features movable classroom walls that can be reconfigured to support a variety of learning needs, learning pods anchoring each wing with technology stations and tiered reading nooks, indoor and outdoor stages, a broadcast and recording room, and a cafeteria design that features smaller seating groups and improved acoustics. It is the district's first two-story elementary school.
Cedar Lane Elementary
Lorewood Grove Elementary
Old State Elementary
Olive B. Loss Elementary
Silver Lake Elementary has 36 classrooms and over 710 students
In 1998 the school district did a program where 21 kindergarten students were put in a program with smaller class sizes, which resulted in higher student success.
Townsend Elementary has 24 classrooms and over 570 students.
The 1998 smaller classes experiment was also done at Townsend.

Early childhood centers
Appoquinimink Early Childhood Center
Brick Mill Early Childhood Center
Cedar Lane Early Childhood Center
Spring Meadow Early Childhood Center
Townsend Early Childhood Center

Facilities
The former Odessa School No. 61 houses the district headquarters.

The Marion Proffitt Training Center is in Odessa.

References

External links
District webpage
Department of Education school profiles

School districts in New Castle County, Delaware
Middletown, Delaware